The following musical events and releases are expected to happen in 2023 in Canada.

Events
 March 13 – Juno Awards of 2023
 April 2 – 18th Canadian Folk Music Awards

Date TBA

 SOCAN Songwriting Prize
 Prism Prize
 2023 Canadian Country Music Awards
 2023 Polaris Music Prize
 45th Félix Awards

Albums released

A
Matt Andersen, The Big Bottle of Joy - March 10

B
Gord Bamford, Fire It Up - April 28
Jill Barber, Homemaker - February 10
Begonia, Powder Blue - February 24
Louise Burns, Element - April 21

C
Daniel Caesar, Never Enough - April 7
Chiiild, Better Luck in the Next Life - March 3
City and Colour, The Love Still Held Me Near - March 31

D
DijahSB, Living Simple - February 10
Gord Downie and Bob Rock, Lustre Parfait - May 5
Dumas, Cosmologie - January 27

E
Jade Eagleson, TBA

F
Feist, Multitudes - April 14
Dominique Fils-Aimé, Our Roots Run Deep - September
Fucked Up, One Day - January 27

G
Jenn Grant, Champagne Problems - June
Great Lake Swimmers, Uncertain Country - April 28
Emm Gryner, Business & Pleasure

H
Hayden, Are We Good - April 5
Tim Hecker, No Highs - April 28
Matt Holubowski, Like Flowers on a Molten Lawn - March 24

J
July Talk, Remember Never Before - January 20

K
Kid Koala, Creatures Of The Late Afternoon - April 14
Brett Kissel, The Compass Project - East Album - March
Brett Kissel, The Compass Project - North Album - Fall
Brett Kissel, The Compass Project - South Album - January 27
Brett Kissel, The Compass Project - West Album - June

L
Murray A. Lightburn, Once Upon a Time in Montreal - March 31

N
The New Pornographers, Continue as a Guest - March 31
The Northern Pikes, Time To Time - June 2

P
MacKenzie Porter, TBA
William Prince, Stand in the Joy - April 14

R
Raised By Swans, Volume 2: Run With The Silent Wildfires - March 30
Justin Rutledge, Something Easy - May 19

S
Jacques Kuba Séguin, Parfum I - February 24
Ron Sexsmith, The Vivian Line
Andy Shauf, Norm - February 10
Gabrielle Shonk, Across the Room
Dallas Smith, TBA
Sum 41, Heaven and Hell - TBA

T
Shania Twain, Queen of Me - February 3

U
U.S. Girls, Bless This Mess - February 24
Universal Honey, Dandelion

W
Wax Mannequin, The Red Brain
Whitehorse, I'm Not Crying, You're Crying - January 13

Deaths
January 12 - Robbie Bachman, drummer (Bachman–Turner Overdrive)
January 17 - Leon Dubinsky, songwriter ("Rise Again")
February 7 - Mendelson Joe, guitarist and painter

References